Babaaláwo or Babalawo  in West Africa (Babalao in Caribbean and South American Spanish and Babalaô in Brazilian Portuguese) literally means "father of secrets" or "father of the mysteries" in the Yoruba language. It is a spiritual title that denotes a high priest of the Ifá oracle. Ifá is a divination system that represents the teachings of the Òrìṣà Ọrunmila, the Òrìṣà of Wisdom, who in turn serves as the oracular representative of Olodumare.

Functions in society
The Babalawos are believed to ascertain the future of their clients through communication with Ifá. This is done through the interpretation of either the patterns of the divining chain known as Opele, or the sacred palm nuts called Ikin, on the traditionally wooden divination tray called Opon Ifá.

In addition to this, some of them also perform divination services on behalf of the kings and paramount chiefs of the Yoruba people. These figures, holders of chieftaincy titles like Araba and Oluwo Ifa in their own right, are members of the recognised aristocracies of the various Yoruba traditional states.

People can visit Babalawos for spiritual consultations, which is known as Dafa. The religious system as a whole has been recognized by UNESCO as a “Masterpiece of the Oral and Intangible Heritage of Humanity."

See also
Ifá
Iyalawo
Babalú

References

External links 
 http://ifa-houseofwisdom.com/babalawo.html
 https://web.archive.org/web/20180102013424/http://www.ifafoundation.org/does-the-babalawo-tell-all/

Religious occupations
 
Yoruba culture
Yoruba words and phrases